Lilith: A Snake in the Grass is a 1981 science fiction novel by American writer Jack L. Chalker. It is the first book in his Four Lords of the Diamond series.

Plot summary
The Confederacy, a massive space empire, duplicates the personality of its best agent and implants it into four brain-dead hosts. These hosts are sent to the four planets of a penal colony, the Warden Diamond, to investigate an alien threat and assassinate the four lords of the planets, the "Four Lords of the Diamond." The original agent is on a picket ship and downloads information from his copies.

A copy of the agent wakes up in the body of "Cal Tremon," a criminal on a prison ship heading to Lilith. He must then adapt to Lilith, a beautiful tropical world where its Warden Organism, a symbiotic microorganism, destroys all non-Lilith material, making modernization very difficult. Thus, the several million inhabitants of Lilith's feudal society are serfs. The nobility of Lilith are the few who can control the organisms.

The agent thus finds himself a serf, with no hope of advancing unless he harnesses the power of the Warden Organisms. When a girl he liked was being taken away for experimentation, he taps into his Warden powers and kills the overseer, a petty tyrant.

While living in the Castle, the residence of the Duke, Cal gains some initial training and knowledge. He escapes when he learns that the nobles plan to kill him.  Outside of the castle walls, he gains a secure status in Lilith's society and no longer desires to serve the Confederacy.

Instead, he realizes that the Lord of Lilith, Marek Kreegan, a former Assassin of the Confederacy, cooperates with the aliens to preserve peace and order. Cal learns that Kreegan dissuaded the aliens from a genocide against humanity, choosing the slower course of subversion and sabotage instead.  Cal does not kill Kreegan.  His girlfriend, believing that Kreegan's death would will elevate Cal to Lordship, kills Kreegan by using a potion to draw on Cal's power.

The Agent wakes up in the picket ship, worried about his duplicate's behavior in Lilith.

Reception
Greg Costikyan reviewed Lilith: A Snake in the Grass in Ares Magazine #12 and commented that "Chalker's prose is stilted, but his ideas are exciting. Worth buying if you don't mind forced writing."

Reviews
Review by W. Ritchie Benedict (1982) in Science Fiction Review, Summer 1982
Review by Alan Fraser (1990) in Paperback Inferno, #85

References

1981 American novels
American science fiction novels
Del Rey books
Novels by Jack L. Chalker